Karl H. Gingrich is a United States Army major general who serves as director of program analysis and evaluation. He previously served as the director of capability and resource integration of the United States Cyber Command.

In January 2023, Gingrich was nominated for promotion to lieutenant general.

References

External links

Living people
United States Army generals
Year of birth missing (living people)